Michael Christian  is an Australian radio presenter. Along with his co-host Mel Greig, he perpetrated a prank call to the hospital caring for Catherine, Duchess of Cambridge that contributed to the suicide of one of the nurses.

Career 
In February 2006, Christian started his radio career at Sea FM Central Coast, after completing a Graduate Diploma in Commercial Radio Broadcasting at the Australian Film, Television & Radio School. He later moved on to become a morning announcer at 92.9 Perth. 

On 5 October 2009, Christian started a position as the afternoons announcer at Austereo's Fox FM in Melbourne, Victoria before moving to mornings.  He moved to Sydney's 2Day FM in December 2012 to host the Hot30 Countdown with Mel Greig, a nationally syndicated program.

Royal prank

On 6 December 2012, Christian and his 2Day FM radio co-host, Mel Greig, made a radio prank call to the hospital that was caring for Catherine, Duchess of Cambridge, during her first pregnancy. The duo tricked the hospital into releasing private medical information on the Duchess by using "ridiculous comedy accents" to mimic Queen Elizabeth II and the Prince of Wales in an attempt to talk with the Duchess.

Two days later Jacintha Saldanha, one of the nurses who was tricked by the pair, was found dead in a suspected suicide.

Both Christian and Greig were seen on their Twitter accounts boasting about the prank a day earlier, calling it "the easiest prank call ever made." They were both suspended from broadcasting following the death. In an interview on the Nine Network's A Current Affair program, Christian said that "We are shattered, heartbroken and our deepest sympathy goes to the family, friends and all those people affected. Mel and myself are incredibly sorry for the situation and what's happened."

On 27 January 2013, 2Day FM's parent company announced on its Facebook page that the Hot 30 show responsible for the prank would not be returning.

Christian returned to the Melbourne Fox FM morning program on 11 February 2013, and his move there created controversy.

On Sunday 28 April 2013 the Sunday Times newspaper in the United Kingdom reported Saldanha had authored a suicide note blaming Christian and Greig. She also asked that they be made responsible for her mortgage.

In June 2013, Southern Cross Austereo awarded Christian the Next Top Jock award, a decision that was criticised in the Australian media. Australian National Communications Minister Stephen Conroy told a Melbourne radio station "I think there’s a bit of bad taste involved there. There were some very serious consequences of what was a prank and to be seen to be rewarding people so soon after such an event, I think, is just in bad taste."

In 2015, Christian returned to 2Day FM as a staff announcer.

References

External links

Australian radio personalities
Living people
Year of birth missing (living people)
Place of birth missing (living people)
Shock jocks